Mupfure River is a river in Zimbabwe with its source in Mashonaland East Province and crossing into Mashonaland West Province. It joins the Sanyati river which flows northwards and drains into the Zambezi river.

Rivers of Zimbabwe